Oleksii Oliinyk (born 17 March 1994) is a Ukrainian former competitive ice dancer. With Valeria Haistruk, he won the 2016 Ukrainian national title. They placed 14th at the 2015 World Junior Championships in Tallinn, Estonia, and 26th at the 2016 European Championships in Bratislava, Slovakia. They were coached by Maria Tumanovska.

In April 2018, Oliinyk joined the coaching staff at a skating club in Prešov, Slovakia.

Programs 
(with Haistruk)

Competitive highlights 
CS: Challenger Series; JGP: Junior Grand Prix

With Haistruk

References

External links 
 

1994 births
Ukrainian emigrants to Slovakia
Ukrainian male ice dancers
Living people
Sportspeople from Kyiv